Epiphyas ashworthana is a moth of the family Tortricidae. It is found in Australia.

The wingspan is about 20 mm.

The larvae feed on Acacia dealbata and Acacia baileyana.

References

Moths described in 1856
Epiphyas